Trace Junction is an unincorporated community in Logan County in the U.S. state of West Virginia.

References 

Unincorporated communities in West Virginia
Unincorporated communities in Logan County, West Virginia